The Birds Directive (formally known as Council Directive 2009/147/EC on the conservation of wild birds) is the oldest piece of EU legislation on the environment and one of its cornerstones which was  unanimously adopted in April 1979 as the Directive 79/409/EEC. Amended in 2009, it became the Directive 2009/147/EC. It aims to protect all European wild birds and the habitats of listed species, in particular through the designation of Special Protection Areas (often known by the acronym SPA).

The Birds Directive is one of the EU's two directives in relation to wildlife and nature conservation, the other being the Habitats Directive. The Habitats Directive led to the setting up of a network of Special Areas of Conservation, which together with the existing Special Protection Areas form a network of protected sites across the European Union called Natura 2000. In the UK the Directive is implemented by the Wildlife and Countryside Act 1981.

See also
 Conservation movement
 List of European Union directives
 EU law

References
 Jan-Henrik Meyer: 2010. Saving Migrants: a Transnational Network supporting Supranational Bird Protection Policy in the 1970's. In Transnational Networks in Regional Integration. Informal Governance in Europe 1945–83, edited by W. Kaiser, M. Gehler and B. Leucht. Basingstoke. Palgrave, 176–198. , .
 Jan-Henrik Meyer: Zivilgesellschaftliche Mobilisierung und die frühe europäische Umweltpolitik. Die Vogelschutzrichtlinie der Europäischen Gemeinschaften von 1979. In: Themenportal Europäische Geschichte (2013).

External links
 Council Directive 79/409/EEC of 2 April 1979 on the conservation of wild birds (Official text of the old directive on EUR-Lex)
 National execution measures of the old directive 
 Directive 2009/147/EC of the European Parliament and of the Council of 30 November 2009 on the conservation of wild birds (Official text on EUR-Lex)
 National execution measures of the new directive 
 A page about the Birds Directive at the European Commissions website
 A page about the Birds Directive at the JNCC's website

Bird conservation
European Union directives
Environmental law in the European Union
2009 in law
2009 in the European Union